Underwoodisaurus seorsus is a species of lizard in the family Gekkonidae. It is endemic to the Packsaddle Range in western Australia.

References

seorsus
Geckos of Australia
Reptiles described in 2011
Taxa named by Paul Doughty
Taxa named by Paul M. Oliver